Areca triandra, the wild areca palm, is a palm which is often used as ornamental plant. It is native to India, Bangladesh, Cambodia, Laos, Burma, Thailand, Vietnam, Malaysia, Indonesia, and the Philippines. It is also reportedly naturalized in Panama and in southern China. As a wild plant, it commonly occurs in littoral forest in Southeast Asia.

Ethnobotany
A name for this palm is sla: préi in Khmer. In Cambodia, the nut may be chewed with betel in a quid, while the timber is used for temporary constructions, such as huts.

References

triandra
Flora of tropical Asia
Plants described in 1826